Fruitvale Independent School District is a 2A independent school district based in Fruitvale, Texas (USA).

There are three campuses at Fruitvale ISD - 
 Fruitvale High School (Grades 9-12)
 Fruitvale Junior High School (Grades 6-8)
 Hallie Randall Elementary (Grades PK-5)

Academic achievement
In 2009, the school district was rated "academically acceptable" by the Texas Education Agency.

Special programs
Fruitvale High School plays Six-man football

See also

List of school districts in Texas

References

External links

School districts in Van Zandt County, Texas
School districts established in 1964